The Besor (Nahal HaBesor) is a wadi in southern Israel. The stream begins at Mount Boker (near Sde Boker), and spills into the Mediterranean Sea near Al-Zahra in the Gaza Strip, where it is called Wadi Gaza, also spelled Wadi Ghazza or Wadi 'Azza. Further upstream it is marked as Wadi esh-Shallaleh on the 1878 Survey of Western Palestine map. There are several important archaeological sites located in this area.

The stream is the largest in the northern Negev, and together with its largest tributaries, the Nahal Gerar, and the Beersheba stream, reaches as far east into the desert as Sde Boker, Yeruham, Dimona and Arad/Tel Arad. The Gaza section of the Coastal Aquifer is the only significant source of water in the Gaza Strip. The Wadi Gaza runs through a wetland, the Gaza Valley, and as of 2012 it is used as a wastewater dump.

History

In the Old Testament Besor was a ravine or brook in the extreme south-west of Judah, where 200 of David's men stayed behind because they were faint, while the other 400 pursued the Amalekites.

Between 1951 and 1954, the Yeruham Dam was built on one of the tributaries of the HaBesor Stream.

Geography

The source of Besor River lies at Mount Boker, near Sde Boker and the educational center Midreshet Ben-Gurion. From there it flows northwest towards the town of Ashalim, where it meets Nahal Be'er Hayil.

From there it flows north towards the ancient town of Haluza (Al-Khalasa). Then it continues northwest until it meets Beersheba River a little to the east from the town of Tze'elim.

Near the village of Re'im, Nahal Besor meets the Nahal Gerar river, which is its biggest tributary.

One of the tributaries of Besor River reaches kibbutz Urim. Tributaries from south to north: HaRo'e Stream, Boker Stream, Mesora Stream, Zalzal Stream, Revivim Stream, Atadim Stream, Beersheba Stream, Assaf Stream, Amar Stream, Sahaf Stream and Wadi Abu Katrun.

Finally, Bezor Stream flows across the Israeli border with the Gaza Strip, and into the Mediterranean sea.

Wadi Gaza Nature Reserve

The Wadi Gaza Nature Reserve was declared a nature reserve by the Environmental Quality Authority of Palestinian Authority in June 2000. It is confined to the course of the Wadi and its floodplain and banks within the Palestinian jurisdiction.

Archaeology

Nahal Besor has shown evidence of epipaleolithic sites above paleolithic sediments. Several archaeological sites were excavated by Eann Macdonald in 1929 to 1930 along the Wadi Ghazzeh in lower Nahal Besor that show signs of specialist flint production. Some of these sites were re-excavated in 1969 by Jean Perrot.

Finds of pottery and flints were studied by Ann Roshwalb who found evidence of both Egyptian and late Neolithic occupations.

There are several important Bronze Age archaeological sites in this area. Among them are :fr:Tel Gamma, and Tell el-Farah (South). A smaller site of Qubur al-Walaydah is located between them.

Tell Jemmeh/Tel Gamma

Tell Jemmeh (Arabic) or Tel Gamma (תל גמה; Hebrew) is located on the west side of Nahal Besor, near Re'im. The huge site (close to 50,000 m2 in size) shows a continuous occupation from the Late Bronze Age ("Canaanite period") until the Byzantine era. The first archaeological excavations mistakenly identified it as biblical Gerar.

The site was continuously settled only between the Middle Bronze IIB (c. 1700–1550 BC) and the Persian period (c. 530–330 BC). During the Iron I (c. 1200–1000 BC) the site was part of the Philistine territory.

Tel Gamma has been identified by researchers as the Canaanite city of Yurzah (ירזה), that was cited on the lists of Pharaoh Thutmose III (15th century BC), as well as in Amarna letters.

Yurzah is again mentioned in an inscription of the Assyrian king Esarhaddon (seventh century) as one of the cities that rose up against the Assyrian domination and whose queen was deported to Nineveh.

The site also features Assyrian style buildings, ancient iron furnaces, a Persian period grain storage shed, and several tombs from the Byzantine period.

Tell el-Farah (South)

Tell el-Farah (South), sometimes referred to as Tell Fara, is on the west side of Nahal Besor, near Ein HaBesor. It was first excavated by Flinders Petrie in 1928 to 1929 and again recently excavated in 1999 and 2000 under direction of Gunnar Lehmann of Ben-Gurion University of the Negev and Tammi J. Schneider of Claremont Graduate University. As of 2013, it is under excavation again.

Petrie first identified the site as Beth-Pelet and published the excavation reports under the names Beth-Pelet I - II. It has been linked by William Foxwell Albright to the ancient settlement of Sharuhen, although Tell el-Ajjul near the estuary of Nahal Besor, and Tel Haror to the north, are also being suggested.

The earliest major settlement that has been uncovered to date is from the Middle Bronze Age II, lasting from ca. 1650 to 1550 BCE.

It was controlled by Egypt in the Late Bronze Age and inhabited by Philistines into the Iron Age. A hematite seal in the shape of the head of a bull was found and identified by Flinders Petrie to originate from Syria, it showed a bull attacking a lion beneath a scorpion.

Nahal Besor has been suggested to be the Brook of Egypt.

Various ostraca have been recovered from around the site with Aramaic inscriptions analysed and translated by Joseph Naveh.

Flooding
HaBesor Stream is subject to annual flooding following heavy rains. Some Palestinians have claimed that Israel is at fault for the flooding, due to the opening of one or more dams opened upstream, and in 2015, AFP posted a video showing flooding, entitled "Gaza village floods after Israel opens dam gates." Several days later, AFP published a story acknowledging that "no such dam exists in Israel that could control the flow of water into Gaza, according to a team of AFP reporters on the ground as well as interviews with Israeli and international experts."

See also
 Tell es-Sakan, an important Early Bronze Age site at the mouth of the river
 Nahal Hevron
 Ein HaBesor
 Tourism in Israel

References

External links

 Official website of the Tell el-Farah excavations, Nahal Besor. Claremont Graduate University.

Rivers of Israel
Geography of the Gaza Strip
Landforms of Southern District (Israel)
Rivers of the Gaza Strip
Hebrew Bible rivers
Negev
Hebrew Bible valleys